Salvia haematodes can refer to:

Salvia haematodes L., a synonym of Salvia pratensis subsp. haematodes (L.) Arcang.
Salvia haematodes Scop., a synonym of Salvia sclarea L.